Thirteen Doorways, Wolves Behind Them All is a young adult novel by Laura Ruby, published October 1, 2019, by Balzer + Bray.

Reception 
Thirteen Doors, Wolves Behind Them All received a starred review from School Library Journal and Booklist, as well as positive reviews from Publishers Weekly, Kirkus, Common Sense Media, and The New York Times.

The book also received the following accolades:

 National Book Award for Young People's Literature Finalist (2019)
 Booklist Editors' Choice: Books for Youth (2019)
 YALSA's Best Fiction for Young Adults (2020)
 Rise: A Feminist Book Project Top Ten (2020)

The audiobook received a positive review from Booklist.

References 

2019 American novels
Balzer + Bray books